Putneyville is an unincorporated community in Mahoning Township, Armstrong County, Pennsylvania, United States.

History
A post office called Putneyville was established in 1844 and remained in operation until 1970.

References

Unincorporated communities in Armstrong County, Pennsylvania
Unincorporated communities in Pennsylvania